Sitar-e Abdol Rahim (also Romanized as Sītār-e ʿAbdol Raḩīm; also known as Sītār-e Shahdād and Sītār) is a village in Sand-e Mir Suiyan Rural District, Dashtiari District, Chabahar County, Sistan and Baluchestan Province, Iran. At the 2006 census, its population was 140, in 31 families.

References 

Populated places in Chabahar County